Gastrotheca flamma is a species of frog in the family Hemiphractidae. It is endemic to northeastern Brazil and only known from its type locality, Serra da Jibóia in the municipality of Santa Teresinha, Bahia.

References

flamma
Amphibians of Brazil
Endemic fauna of Brazil
Amphibians described in 2008